McLaren Falls is a settlement in the Western Bay of Plenty District and Bay of Plenty Region of New Zealand's North Island.

References

Western Bay of Plenty District
Populated places in the Bay of Plenty Region